The McHugh–Andrews House at 202 Remington St. in Fort Collins, Colorado was built in 1885.  It was designed by builder-architect Montezuma Fuller and it was also a work of Lars P. Kemoe.  It was listed on the National Register of Historic Places in 1978.

References

Houses on the National Register of Historic Places in Colorado
Queen Anne architecture in Colorado
Romanesque Revival architecture in Colorado
Houses completed in 1885
Buildings and structures in Fort Collins, Colorado
Houses in Larimer County, Colorado
National Register of Historic Places in Larimer County, Colorado